William McCoy or MacCoy may refer to:

W. F. McCoy (1886–1976), Speaker of the Northern Ireland House of Commons
William McCoy (bootlegger) (1877–1948), American rum-runner during Prohibition
William McCoy (congressman) (died 1864), American politician and member of Congress
William McCoy (mutineer) (c. 1763–1798), Scottish mutineer on HMS Bounty
William McCoy (Oregon politician) (1921–1996), American politician and member of the Oregon Legislative Assembly
William D. McCoy (1853–1893), American diplomat
William F. MacCoy (1840–1914), lawyer and politician in Nova Scotia, Canada
William J. McCoy (composer) (1848–1926), American composer
William J. McCoy (Mississippi politician) (1942–2019), American politician and Speaker of the Mississippi House of Representatives
William John McCoy (1834–1897), American politician and member of the Wisconsin State Assembly

Willie McCoy (rapper) (died 2019), rapper
Bill McCoy (cricketer) (1906-1980), New Zealand cricketer